Maija Järvelä also commonly known as Maija Loytynoja (born 17 January 1984) is a Finnish female biathlete and cross-country skier. She has represented Finland at the Paralympics in 2006, 2010 and 2014. Maija Jarvela achieved her solitary medal in her Paralympic career securing a silver medal in the women's pursuit standing biathlon event during the 2010 Winter Paralympics, which ultimately was also the first Paralympic medal won by Finland during the start of the 2010 Winter Paralympics.

References

Living people
1984 births
Finnish female cross-country skiers
Finnish female biathletes
Biathletes at the 2006 Winter Paralympics
Biathletes at the 2010 Winter Paralympics
Biathletes at the 2014 Winter Paralympics
Cross-country skiers at the 2006 Winter Paralympics
Cross-country skiers at the 2010 Winter Paralympics
Cross-country skiers at the 2014 Winter Paralympics
Paralympic biathletes of Finland
Paralympic cross-country skiers of Finland
Paralympic silver medalists for Finland
Medalists at the 2010 Winter Paralympics
People from Raahe
Paralympic medalists in biathlon
Sportspeople from North Ostrobothnia
21st-century Finnish women